Asmai may refer to:

 Al-Asma'i (c. 740 – 828), Arab scholar, philologist and anthologist at the court of Haroun al-Rashid
 Asmai Heights in Afghanistan